José Hernando (born 30 April 1968) is a Spanish former swimmer who competed in the 1988 Summer Olympics.

References

1968 births
Living people
Spanish male freestyle swimmers
Olympic swimmers of Spain
Swimmers at the 1988 Summer Olympics
Place of birth missing (living people)
Mediterranean Games bronze medalists for Spain
Mediterranean Games medalists in swimming
Swimmers at the 1991 Mediterranean Games